José Oliveira (born 28 October 1997), is a football player who currently plays for Timor-Leste national football team.

International career
José Oliveira made his senior international debut in an 8-0 loss against United Arab Emirates national football team in the 2018 FIFA World Cup qualification on 12 November 2015.

International goals
Scores and results list Chinese Taipei's goal tally first.

References

1997 births
Living people
East Timorese footballers
Timor-Leste international footballers
Association football midfielders